The fourth elections for Cardiganshire County Council took place in March 1898. They were preceded by the 1895 election and followed by the 1901 election

Overview of the Result

At the fourth elections held for the County Council, the Liberals retained their large majority.

Boundary Changes
There were boundary changes in the Aberaeron area, arising from the formation of the Aberaeron Urban District Council in 1894.

Unopposed Returns

There were a number of unopposed returns. The Conservatives held seats they won in 1895 including Borth and Cardigan South while Independent Conservative  Henry Bonsall was returned unopposed for Bow Street.

Contested Elections
The Liberals won Aberystwyth No.1, lost in 1895, after the Unionists failed to field a candidate.

Retiring Aldermen

Eight aldermen retired. Of these only Peter Jones  (Trefeurig) and Jenkin Jenkins (Felinfach) sought re-election, although two others (John Powell and Evan Richards) would be re-elected without facing the electorate. Jenkins was defeated at Felinfach by Walter T. Davies. Davies, however was among those who were chosen as new aldermen enabling Jenkins to contest the by-election (see below). Four aldermen retired namely W.O. Brigstocke, Dr Jenkin Lewis, David Lloyd and D.W. E. Rowland.

The New Council

J.C. Harford of Falcondale was elected as the first Conservative chairman on a motion moved by Peter Jones.

|}

Council following the election of aldermen and by-elections

|}

|}

Results

Aberaeron

Aberarth

Aberbanc
David Lloyd, an alderman from 1889 to 1895 was returned unopposed.

Aberporth

Aberystwyth Division 1

Aberystwyth Division 2

Aberystwyth Division 3
A repeat of the contest in 1895. Ellis increased his majority from 7 to 29.

Aberystwyth Division 4
James had been elected at the 1895 by-election following C.M. Williams's re-appointment as alderman.

Borth

Bow Street

Cardigan North

Cardigan South

Cilcennin

Jenkin Lewis had previously sat as an Unionist.

Cwmrheidol
The seat changed hands for the third time, with Nicholas Bray, the victor in 1889 and 1895 being defeated as he was in 1892.

Devil's Bridge

Felinfach
The sitting councillor defeated Alderman Jenkin Jenkins, who had defeated him by a small majority in 1892.

Goginan

Lampeter Borough
Harford, was again returned unopposed.

Llanarth

Llanbadarn Fawr

Llanddewi Brefi

Llandygwydd

Llandysiliogogo

Llandysul North

Llandysul South

Llanfair Clydogau

Llanfarian

Llanfihangel y Creuddyn

Llangoedmor

Llangeitho

Llangrannog

Llanilar

Llanllwchaiarn

Llanrhystyd

Llansantffraed

Llanwenog

Llanwnen

Lledrod

Nantcwnlle

New Quay

Penbryn

Strata Florida

Taliesin

Talybont

Trefeurig

Tregaron

Troedyraur

Ysbyty Ystwyth

Election of Aldermen

In addition to the 48 councillors the council consisted of 16 county aldermen. Aldermen were elected by the council, and served a six-year term. Following the elections, the following Alderman were appointed by the newly elected council.

Peter Jones, Liberal (retiring alderman, elected councillor at Trefeurig)
Sir Marteine Lloyd, Conservative (from outside the Council, retiring councillor for New Quay)
Evan Richards, Liberal (retiring alderman, from outside Council - did not seek election)
John Morgan Howell, Liberal (elected councillor at Aberaeron)
Walter T. Davies, Liberal (elected councillor at Felinfach)
Rev John Williams, Liberal (elected councillor at Cardigan North)
John Powell, Liberal (retiring alderman, from outside Council - did not seek election)
Rev T. Mason Jones, Liberal (from outside the Council, retiring member for Ysbyty Ystwyth)

With the exception of Sir Marteine Lloyd, of the eight elected aldermen were Liberals. This broke the pattern established in 1889 whereby there were three Conservatives on the aldermanic bench. Of those elected, four were elected members of the Council and four were not. Two retiring aldermen (John Powell and Evan Richards) did not seek re-election although Peter Jones did so. Sir Marteine Lloyd and Rev T. Mason Jones were members of the previous council who did not seek re-election.

By-elections

Only two of the four by-elections was contested.

Aeron by-election
Following the election of J.M. Howell as alderman, a disagreement among local Liberals led to the unopposed return of a prominent Conservative.

Cardigan North by-election
Following the election of the Rev John Williams as alderman, O. Beynon Evans was returned unopposed.

Felinfach by-election
Having lost the election, as retiring alderman, to the retiring councillor, Jenkin Jenkins of Blaenplwyf was returned.

Trefeurig by-election

References

1898
1898 Welsh local elections
19th century in Ceredigion